Gary Allan Polis (1946 – March 27, 2000) was an arachnologist and the world's leading expert on scorpions.

Education and career 
Polis was born in Los Angeles, California. He graduated from Loyola University in 1969. Polis received an M.A. in 1975 and a Ph.D. in biology in 1977 from the University of California, Riverside.

While at UC Riverside, Polis studied under Dr. Roger Farley. He conducted a variety of experiments and did studies of Vaejovidae. He went on to teach at Vanderbilt University from 1979 to 1992 and wrote several books; his Biology of Scorpions has been referred to as the "scorpion Bible." Polis was the subject of the book Scorpion Man by Laurence Pringle.

Polis was noted as a desert ecologist and advised the government on desert scorpions during the Gulf War.

In 1998, Polis became Professor of Environmental Science and Policy at the University of California, Davis, a post he held until his death in 2000.

(from a former student)In 1969 through at least 1972 Gary was a Biology teacher at El Camino High School in Woodland Hills, California.  He was, at that time, a very young man who was much liked by his students.  He always made learning Biology a lot of fun for myself and my fellow students.  He also invited students out on excursions once in a while to help snare lizards and other creatures for the various terrariums and fish tanks in his classroom.  Mr. Polis was easy to make out in a crowd with his mischievous smile.

Death 
Polis died in a seastorm in the Sea of Cortez during an ecological expedition. He was cited by a survivor as attempting to help others reach safety as a priority before his own. 

On the boat used in his last expedition in the Sea Of Cortez were some exchange students from Japan, who were attending UC Davis.  The exchange students had been washed overboard when the storm blew up unexpectedly.  Reportedly, they did not have their life preservers on.  Mr. Polis gave up his life preserver, a gracious act that ended up costing him his own life.

References

External links 
Gary Polis Papers at Special Collections Dept. , University Library, University of California, Davis

1946 births
2000 deaths
American arachnologists
University of California, Riverside alumni
Vanderbilt University faculty
20th-century American zoologists
Scientists from Los Angeles
Loyola Marymount University alumni
University of California, Davis faculty
Accidental deaths in Mexico